Daniel Arnold is a Canadian actor and writer based in Vancouver, British Columbia. He is most noted as cowriter with Darrell Dennis and Medina Hahn of Inheritance: a pick-the-path experience, a stage play which was shortlisted for the Governor General's Award for English-language drama at the 2022 Governor General's Awards. Inheritance: a pick-the-path experience is a stage play about indigenous land claims which features points at which the audience can vote on the direction the story would take, requiring the actors to be prepared for at least 50 different possible permutations of the performance.

Born in Nelson, British Columbia, and raised in Edmonton, Alberta, he studied theatre at the University of Alberta as a classmate of Hahn, with whom he has remained closely associated as partners in the DualMinds theatre company. His other plays have included Tuesdays & Sundays, Any Night, and The Ridiculous Darkness.

He won two Elizabeth Sterling Haynes Awards in 2001 for Tuesdays & Sundays, as Outstanding New Work and Outstanding Actor. In 2008, when Daniel MacIvor won the Siminovitch Prize in Theatre, he selected Arnold and Hahn as the winners of the Protégé honour.

In film, he is most noted as the writer and co-star of Lawrence & Holloman, the 2013 film adaptation of Morris Panych's stage play, and for his role as Richard Maynard in the 2021 film Be Still. He received Leo Award nominations for Best Actor in a Film and Best Screenwriting for Lawrence & Holloman in 2014, and Best Actor in a Film for Be Still in 2022, and received a Canadian Comedy Award nomination for Best Writing in a Film at the 15th Canadian Comedy Awards in 2014 for Lawrence & Holloman, which also received the award for Best Feature Film.

References

External links

21st-century Canadian male actors
21st-century Canadian male writers
21st-century Canadian dramatists and playwrights
21st-century Canadian screenwriters
Canadian male film actors
Canadian male television actors
Canadian male stage actors
Canadian male dramatists and playwrights
Canadian male screenwriters
Male actors from Edmonton
Male actors from Vancouver
Writers from Edmonton
Writers from Vancouver
University of Alberta alumni
Living people
People from Nelson, British Columbia
Year of birth missing (living people)